Senator Ward may refer to:

Cam Ward (politician) (born 1971), Alabama State Senate
David Jenkins Ward (1871–1961), Maryland State Senate
Durbin Ward (1819–1886), Ohio State Senate
Elisha Ward (1804–1860), New York State Senate
Giles Ward (born 1948), Mississippi State Senate
Hallett Sydney Ward (1870–1956), North Carolina State Senate
Henry Ward (Kentucky politician) (1909–2002), Kentucky State Senate
Horace Ward (1927–2016), Georgia State Senate
James Ward (frontiersman) (1763–1846), Kentucky State Senate
Jasper D. Ward (1829–1902), Illinois State Senate
Jerry Ward (born 1948), Alaska State Senate
John Elliott Ward (1814–1902), Georgia State Senate
John F. Ward (1904–1973), Maine State Senate
John Ward (South Carolina politician) (1767–1816), South Carolina Senate
Jonathan Ward (politician) (1768–1842), New York State Senate
Joseph D. Ward (1914–2003), Massachusetts State Senate
Judy Ward (fl. 2010s), Pennsylvania State Senate
Kelli Ward (born 1969), Arizona State Senate
Kim Ward (fl. 2000s), Pennsylvania State Senate
Lafe Ward (1925–2013), West Virginia State Senate
Matthias Ward (1805–1861), U.S. Senator from Texas
Pat Ward (1950s–2012), Iowa State Senate
Rick Ward III (born 1982), Louisiana State Senate
Ruth Ward (born 1936), New Hampshire Senate
Steve Ward (Colorado legislator) (fl. 1990s–2000s), Colorado State Senate
Stewart Ward, fictional U.S. Senator from New York in Marvel Comics

See also
Janie Ward-Engelking (fl. 2010s), Idaho State Senate